Suolijärvi is a small lake in Tampere, Finland. It is situated west of the suburb Hervanta. It has a small beach where people can sunbathe or swim during the summer.  There are also two trails which bound the lake.

The name derives from Finnish suoli (intestine) and järvi (lake). This is probably due to the curved shape of the lake.

Suolijärvi is also a village near Puolanka in the Northern Finland east of Oulu.

References

Kokemäenjoki basin
Landforms of Pirkanmaa
Hervanta
Lakes of Tampere